Genoa is a city in the north-east corner of DeKalb County, Illinois, United States. It is located on the historic Galena-Chicago stagecoach route. At the 2020 census the city had a population of 5,298, up from 5,193 in 2010.

History
Genoa was settled as early as 1835 by Thomas Madison, an American Revolutionary War soldier from Ashtabula County, Ohio. He named Genoa after a town of the same name in New York.  Genoa was incorporated as a village in 1876 and as a city on September 9, 1911.

Geography

Demographics
As of the 2020 census there were 5,298 people, 1,919 households, and 1,251 families residing in the city. The racial makeup of the city was 78.84% White, 0.91% African American, 0.42% Native American, 0.72% Asian, 6.70% from other races, and 12.42% from two or more races. Hispanic or Latino of any race were 18.89% of the population.

There were 1,919 households, out of which 50.03% had children under the age of 18 living with them, 55.50% were married couples living together, 6.72% had a female householder with no husband present, and 34.81% were non-families. 28.87% of all households were made up of individuals, and 13.76% had someone living alone who was 65 years of age or older. The average household size was 3.30 and the average family size was 2.65.

The city's age distribution consisted of 18.9% under the age of 18, 11.9% from 18 to 24, 29.5% from 25 to 44, 25.2% from 45 to 64, and 14.6% who were 65 years of age or older. The median age was 39.5 years. For every 100 females, there were 107.4 males. For every 100 females age 18 and over, there were 108.4 males.

The median income for a household in the city was $72,795, and the median income for a family was $78,625. Males had a median income of $49,523 versus $28,125 for females. The per capita income for the city was $31,563. About 6.8% of families and 8.8% of the population were below the poverty line, including 8.0% of those under age 18 and 2.1% of those age 65 or over.

Government
Genoa is governed by a mayor and eight-member City Council. The city is divided into four wards, with two aldermen representing each ward. The mayor and aldermen serve four-year terms. The terms of the City Council are staggered such that one alderman from each ward is elected every two years.

City Council Members
Term expiration indicated in parentheses
 Mayor:  Jonathon Brust (2025)
 Ward 1: Christopher Pulley (2025)
 Ward 1: Pam Wesner (2023)
 Ward 2: Melissa Freund (2025)
 Ward 2: James Stevenson (2023)
 Ward 3: Charles(Chuck)Cravatta (2023)
 Ward 3: Courtney Winter (2025)
 Ward 4: Brent Holcomb (2023)
 Ward 4: Katie Lang (2025)

A City Clerk is also elected at-large and serves a four-year term.  The current city clerk is Kendra Braheny, whose term began in 2021.

Education
Genoa is part of the Genoa-Kingston (GK) School District with nearby village Kingston. The district has four Public Schools: Kingston Elementary School (Grades K-2), Genoa Elementary School (Grades 3-5), Genoa-Kingston Middle School (Grades 6-8) and Genoa-Kingston High School (Grades 9-12). The school district's mascot is a “Cog”, and the school sports teams are the G-K Cogs (Acronym for Community of Genoa Schools) with the colors being royal blue and orange.

Sports 
Girls athletics include basketball, cheer leading, cross country, dance team, golf, soccer, softball, track and field, and volleyball. 
Boys athletics include football, baseball, basketball, cross country, golf, soccer, track and field, and wrestling. The town has three state championships to its name: the football team in 1977, the girls track team in 1989, and the girls volleyball team in 2022. Genoa-Kingston High School competes in the Big Northern Conference (BNC), while Genoa-Kingston Middle School competes in the Mid-Northern Conference (MNC).

Notable Person
Edward D. Shurtleff, Illinois state legislator and jurist, was born in Genoa.

References

External links
 City website
 History of Genoa, Illinois

Cities in DeKalb County, Illinois
Populated places established in 1835
Cities in Illinois